Historiographer Royal is the title of an appointment as official chronicler or historian of a court or monarch. It was initially particularly associated with the French monarchy, where the post existed from at least 1550, but in the later 16th and 17th centuries became common throughout Europe. The Historiographer Royal for Scotland is still an existing appointment.

See also
 Chief Chronicler of the Kingdom (Portugal)
 Historiographer Royal (Denmark)
 Historiographer Royal (England)
 Historiographer Royal (Scotland)
 Rikshistoriograf (Sweden)

References

Court titles in the Ancien Régime